A war of annihilation or war of extermination is a type of war in which the goal is the complete annihilation of a state, a people or an ethnic minority through genocide or through the destruction of their livelihood. The goal can be outward-directed or inward, against elements of one's own population. The goal is not like other types of warfare, the recognition of limited political goals, such as recognition of a legal status (such as in a war of independence), control of disputed territory (as in war of aggression or defensive war), or the total military defeat of an enemy state.

Features 
War of annihilation is defined as a radicalized form of warfare in which "all psycho-physical limits" are abolished.

The Hamburg Institute for Social Research social scientist Jan Philipp Reemtsma sees a war, "which is led, in the worst case, to destroy or even decimate a population", as the heart of the war of annihilation.
The state organization of the enemy will be smashed. Another characteristic of a war of annihilation is its ideological character and the rejection of negotiations with the enemy, as the historian Andreas Hillgruber has shown in the example of the Eastern Front of World War II fought between Nazi Germany and the Soviet Union. The legitimacy and trustworthiness of the opponent is negated, demoted to status of a total enemy, with whom there can be no understanding, but rather devotes the totality of one's own "Volk, Krieg und Politik [als] Triumph der Idee des Vernichtungskrieges" (people, war and politics [to the] triumph of the idea of the war of annihilation).

Development

Herero uprising 

Social Democratic Party of Germany political communications had circulated the term Vernichtungskrieg in order to criticize the action against the insurgents during the Herero Wars.

In January 1904 the Herero and Namaqua genocide began in the German colony German South West Africa. With a total of about 15,000 men under Lieutenant General Lothar von Trotha, this uprising was prostrated until August 1904. Most of the Herero fled to the almost waterless Omaheke, an offshoot of the Kalahari Desert. Von Trotha had them locked down and the refugees chased away from the few water spots there, so that thousands of Herero along with their families and cattle herds died of thirst. The hunted in the desert, let Trotha in the so-called Vernichtungsbefehl, "Annihilation Command":

Trotha's warfare aimed at the complete annihilation of the Herero ("I believe that the nation must be destroyed as such") and was supported in particular by Alfred von Schlieffen and Kaiser Wilhelm II. His approach is therefore considered to be the first genocide of the twentieth century. Trotha's action sparked outrage in Germany and abroad; at the instigation of chancellor Bernhard von Bülow, the Emperor lifted the order of annihilation two months after the events in the Omaheke. Trotha's policy remained largely unchanged until its revocation in November 1905.

Ludendorff's conception 
The war of annihilation was a further development of the concept of Total War, as the former imperial General Quartermaster Erich Ludendorff had designed. Thereafter, in a coming war, victory must be given unlimited priority over all other societal concerns: all resources would have to be harnessed, the will of the nation had to be made available before the outbreak of the hostilities are unified by propaganda and dictatorship violence, all available weapons would have to be used, and no consideration could be taken of International law. Even in its objectives, total war is unlimited, as the experience of First World War teaching:

In this conceptual delimitation of the war, Ludendorff was able to draw from the German military-theoretical discourse, which had formed in the confrontation with the People's War, the "Guerre à outrance", which the newly created Third French Republic in the fall and winter of 1870 against the Prussian-German invaders of the Franco-Prussian War.

Ludendorff also dealt with Carl von Clausewitz and his 1832 posthumously published work On War, in which he distinguished between 'absolute' and 'limited' wars. But even for Clausewitz absolute war was subject to restrictions, such as the distinction between combatants and non-combatants, between military and civil or between public and private. Ludendorff claimed now that in total war it is no longer a "petty political purpose", not even "big ... national interests", but the sheer Lebenserhaltung (life-support) of the nation, its identity. This existential threat also justifies the annihilation of the enemy, at least moral, if not physical. Ludendorffs efforts to radicalize the war (for which he was responsible from 1916) met with social, political and military barriers. In the year 1935, his advice was then, as the historian Robert Foley writes, "on fertile ground"; the time seemed ripe for an even more radical delimitation of the war by the Nazis.

Nazi warfare 

The best known example of a Vernichtungskrieg is the Eastern Front of World War II, which began on June 22, 1941, with the German invasion of the Soviet Union. The Free University of Berlin historian Ernst Nolte called this the "most egregious Versklavungs- und Vernichtungskrieg [war of enslavement and annihilation] known to modern history" and distinguished it from a "normal war", as the Nazi regime conducted against France.

According to Andreas Hillgruber, Hitler had four motives in launching Operation Barbarossa, namely
 The extermination not only of the "Jewish Bolshevik elite" who supposedly governed the Soviet Union since seizing power in the Russian Revolution of 1917, but also the extermination of every single Jewish man, woman and child in the Soviet Union.
 Providing Germany with Lebensraum ("living space") by settling millions of German colonists within what was soon to be the former Soviet Union, something that would have required a massive population displacement as millions of Russian Untermenschen ("sub-humans") would have had to be forced out of homes to make way for the Herrenvolk ("master-race") colonists.
 Turning the Russians and other Slavic peoples not expelled from their homes into slaves who would provide Germany with an ultra-cheap labor force to be exploited.
 Using vast natural resources of the Soviet Union to provide the foundation stone of a German-dominated economic zone in Eurasia that would be immune to blockade, and provide Germany with the sufficient economic strength to allow the Reich to conquer the entire world.

Later, Hillgruber explicitly described the character of the Eastern Front as "intended racial-ideological war of annihilation". Operation Barbarossa has also found its way into the historical-political teaching of general education schools as a historical example of an extermination war.

The concept of the war of annihilation was intensely discussed in the 1990s with reference to the Wehrmachtsausstellung of the Hamburg Institute for Social Research, which carried the word "Vernichtungskrieg" in the title. That Operation Barbarossa would be a war of annihilation, Adolf Hitler had pronounced openly on March 30, 1941, before the generals of the Wehrmacht:

The orientation of Operation Barbarossa as a prior planned war of annihilation proves the commands prepared according to the general guidelines cited by Adolf Hitler on 30 March 1941 before the start of the campaign, such as the Barbarossa Decree of 13 May 1941, the Guidelines for the Conduct of the Troops in Russia of 19 May 1941 and the Commissar Order of 6 June 1941. The German guidelines for agricultural policy in the Soviet territories to be conquered are one of the most extreme examples of a robbery and annihilation strategy. In a meeting of the secretaries of State on May 2, 1941, the Hunger Plan prepared: "This will undoubtedly starve tens of millions of people if we get what we need pried out of the country."{{efn|Hierbei werden zweifellos zig Millionen Menschen verhungern, wenn von uns das für uns Notwendige aus dem Lande herausgeholt wird.}}

The German historian Jochen Böhler regarded the invasion of Poland as "prelude to the Vernichtungskrieg" against the Soviet Union 1941.

Use of the term 
German historian Joachim Hoffmann in his book Stalin's Annihilation War (1995) cited a speech by Josef Stalin on 6 November 1941. Stalin said: "Well, if the Germans want a Vernichtungskrieg, they will get it (stormy, prolonged applause). From now on, it will be our task to be the task of all the peoples of the Soviet Union, the task of the fighters, the commanders and the political officials of our army and our fleet, to destroy all invading Germans occupying the territory of our homeland to the last man. No mercy to the German occupiers!" According to later statements by Stalin in the following months, he did not mean a complete annihilation of Germany as his goal of war.

Notes

 References 

 Further reading 
 Jan Philipp Reemtsma: Die Idee des Vernichtungskrieges. Clausewitz – Ludendorff – Hitler. In: Hannes Heer, Klaus Naumann (Eds.): Vernichtungskrieg. Verbrechen der Wehrmacht 1941–1944. Hamburg 1995, S. 377–401.
 Isabel V. Hull: Absolute Destruction: Military Culture and the practises of war in Imperial Germany''. Cornell University Press, 2006, .

Genocide
Military theory
Nazism
Racially motivated violence
Wars by type
Warfare by type